Jonah33 was a Christian hard rock band from Arkansas, US. They released three full-length albums before disbanding in late 2009.

History
Jonah33 was founded by Vince Lichlyter, who grew up in Seattle, Washington. After moving to Arkansas and starting up a student ministry there, he put together a musical ensemble which attracted the interest of Ardent Records. Ardent released the band's first, self-titled album in 2003. A second album, The Strangest Day, followed in 2005, which peaked at No. 49 on Billboard'''s Top Christian Albums chart in 2006. Switching to independent Ares Records, their third LP, The Heart of War, was released in July 2007.

Disband

Jonah33 disbanded in late 2009. Lichlyter posted a blog on Jonah33's Myspace saying that the band felt like it was time to disband. He said that "everything is a season and the Jonah33 season has ended". He is now a solo artist. At the end of the blog he said his new solo career "is only a season just like Jonah33".

Members
Vince Lichlyter - Vocals and Guitar
Jason Rooney - Lead Guitar
Joshua Dougan - Drums
Cory Riley - Bass

Former members
Jonathan Kellum - Guitars
Pete Eekhoff - Bass
Brian Hitt - Guitars

Discography
Studio albums
 2003 — Jonah33 2005 — The Strangest Day 2007 — The Heart of WarEPs
 2003 — Jonah33 EP
 2014 — Dead Man Walking''

References

External links
 
 

Musical groups established in 2002
Musical groups disestablished in 2009
Rock music groups from Arkansas
American Christian rock groups
2002 establishments in Arkansas